Juan Giménez (born 16 February 1927 Date of death 24 July 1987 ) was an Argentine footballer. He played in nine matches for the Argentina national football team in 1956 and 1957. He was also part of Argentina's squad for the 1957 South American Championship.

References

External links
 

1927 births
Possibly living people
Argentine footballers
Argentina international footballers
Footballers from Buenos Aires
Association football defenders
Club Atlético Huracán footballers
Racing Club de Avellaneda footballers
Argentine football managers
Racing Club de Avellaneda managers